Will Success Spoil Rock Hunter? is a 1957 American satirical comedy film starring Jayne Mansfield and Tony Randall, with Betsy Drake, Joan Blondell, John Williams, Henry Jones, Lili Gentle, and Mickey Hargitay, and with a cameo by Groucho Marx. The film is a satire on popular fan culture, Hollywood hype, and the advertising industry, which was profiting from commercials on the relatively new medium of television. It also takes aim at the reduction television caused to the size of movie theater audiences in the 1950s. The film was known as Oh! For a Man! in the United Kingdom.

The film was produced and directed by Frank Tashlin, who also wrote the largely original screenplay, using little more than the title and the character of Rita Marlowe from the successful Broadway play Will Success Spoil Rock Hunter? by George Axelrod. The play had run from 1955 to 1956 and also starred Jayne Mansfield as Rita.

Plot
In lieu of a theme song and opening of the movie, Tashlin instead laid traditional opening credits over faux television commercials for products that failed to deliver what they promised.

The film opens on a writer, Rockwell P. Hunter, who is low on the ladder at the La Salle advertising agency. With the agency set to lose its biggest accountStay-Put Lipstickhe hatches an idea to get the perfect model and spokeswoman for Stay-Put's new line of lipstick, the famous actress with the "oh-so-kissable lips", Rita Marlowe. Fortunately, his teenage niece April - a huge fan of Rita - knows where Rita is staying in New York.

For Rita to endorse the lipstick, however, Rock has to pretend to be her boyfriend to make her real boyfriend, Bobo Branigansky, the star of The Jungle Man TV show, jealous. Bobo leaks the news of Rita's new romance in a TV interview and Rock is suddenly famous as her "Lover Doll". Rock's boss decides to leverage his employee's newfound fame, but when Rock gets Rita to agree on a television spectacular sponsored by Stay-Put, Rock becomes the advertising firm's highest-regarded employee. They two agree to continue this mutually beneficial relationship, garnering media attention Rita and business for Rock. Rita, meanwhile, is miserable; she thinks she is falling in love with Rock, but her one real true love is the man who discovered her, George Schmidlap. Not being able to find Schmidlap, she pursues Rock, though her secretary Vi warns her that she is playing a dangerous game. (Ironically, Joan Blondell, who plays Mansfield's frumpy, middle-aged, all-business secretary, was herself a major movie sex symbol some 30 years before, and whose sexuality was an early target of the Hays Code). Meanwhile, his angry fiancée Jenny is jealous, and in a bid to get back his attention, starts dressing and talking like Rita (much to Rock's frustration).

The film includes a comedic intermission, which Rock says is for the audience used to television breaks. 

Rock soon finds fame to be a double-edged sword, getting him what he wants, but with a price to be paid for that success. Women are crazy about him, and he has no peace of mind. Ultimately, he moves up the ladder at work, becoming company president, only to find it is not what he really wanted. Rock confesses to Jenny that he finds himself at the top of the heap without any meaning and she takes him back.

As Rita opens her television spectacular for Stay-Put Lipstick, she is surprised by the appearance of the show's "surprise" guest star of (and the one true love of her life), George Schmidlap. The two kiss and reunite.

Freed from the strain of advertising, Rock and Jenny retire to the country to tend a chicken farm, announcing that he has found the real "living end".

Main cast

Production
Will Success Spoil Rock Hunter? received a nomination for a Golden Globe for Best Motion Picture Actor – Musical/Comedy (Tony Randall) and a nomination for the Writers Guild of America, East WGA Award (Screen) for Best Written American Comedy (Frank Tashlin). The character Rita Marlowe is based on the dumb blonde stereotype epitomized by roles performed by Marilyn Monroe at the time. Initially, Tashlin envisioned Ed Sullivan for the role of Rockwell P. Hunter. Sullivan turned it down, so Tony Randall was awarded the part.

The film contains joking references to several of Mansfield's other roles, including The Girl Can't Help It (1956; also directed by Tashlin), Kiss Them for Me (1957), and The Wayward Bus (1957). The book Mansfield reads in the bathtub scene is Peyton Place (1956) by Grace Metalious, which became a feature film and a popular TV series. The buxom characters in the book were claimed to have been inspired by Mansfield.

Former silent film star Minta Durfee has an uncredited role as a scrubwoman.

Randall is featured at the beginning of the film playing the drums, a trumpet, and a string bass during the 20th Century-Fox logo and fanfare sequence. At the end, he remarks, "Oh, the fine print they put in an actor's contract these days!"

Legacy
Will Success Spoil Rock Hunter? is known as Mansfield's "signature film". In 1966 Frank Tashlin said it was the film of his with which he was "most satisfied... there was no compromise on that one. Buddy Adler let me do it my own way."

There's a reference to this film in the film of the 1964 spy novel Funeral in Berlin, starring Michael Caine as Harry Palmer. When the secret agent Palmer gets forged papers with a new identity, he is dissatisfied with the name given to him and complains, "Rock Hunter! Why can't I be Rock Hunter?"

In 2000, the film was selected for preservation in the United States National Film Registry by the Library of Congress as being "culturally, historically, or aesthetically significant".

Reception

Critical response
On review aggregator Rotten Tomatoes, 86% of 22 critics have given the film a positive review. James Powers of The Hollywood Reporter praised the film as "social satire at its most penetrating" with a focus on "the inanities of TV" and on the mainstream notion of success itself. Powers wrote: "The joy of Tashlin's parable is so funny that you don't feel the blow until you see the bruise. You are laughing at some very silly people that you do not realize until much later very much resemble you." Powers even claimed that the unconventional opening titles "could stand by themselves as among the funniest sequences ever filmed." Picturegoer called the film the "the most savage debunking" of television to date, claiming Hollywood "cut its home-screen rival down to size." Variety called it one of the funniest films of the year, noting how effective Frank Tashlin's "one-man band" approach was to the production: "Producer Tashlin obviously was determined to shoot the works for director Tashlin who in turn knew how to handle the scripter Tashlin." 

Film critic Bosley Crowther of The New York Times criticized Tashlin's script as lacking "substance and cohesion," claiming that the satire failed to prove movie entertainment as superior to television. In his review, Crowther wrote: "People who live in glass houses should not throw stones at their television sets, no matter how scornful and superior they may feel toward video. The rocks may miss the vexing targets and crash through their own fragile walls. This axiom is clearly demonstrated in the flimsy motion picture that has been made from the flimsy stage play Will Success Spoil Rock Hunter?". He also criticized Mansfield's portrayal of Rita Marlowe, a character meant to impersonate Marilyn Monroe, calling the portrayal a "travesty."

Ethan de Seife wrote in his book, Tashlinesque: The Hollywood Comedies of Frank Tashlin, that we see with Son of Paleface, Marry Me Again, Artists and Models, Will Success Spoil Rock Hunter?, The Man from the Diners' Club, The Private Navy of Sergeant O'Farrell, and many others that American animation and American live-action comedy derive from the same tradition. Peter Lev wrote in his book, Twentieth Century-Fox: The Zanuck-Skouras Years, 1935–1965, "Will Success Spoil Rock Hunter? is more fragmented than The Girl Can't Help It, and paradoxically it makes it a better film."

Awards and nominations

Home media
Will Success Spoil Rock Hunter? is in a package called "The Jayne Mansfield Collection" along with The Girl Can't Help It (1956) and The Sheriff of Fractured Jaw (1958)

The film was released on VHS on July 2, 1996, by 20th Century Fox Home Entertainment.

References

Citations

Sources

External links
 
 
 
 
 

1957 films
1950s business films
1957 romantic comedy films
1950s satirical films
20th Century Fox films
American business films
American films based on plays
American romantic comedy films
American satirical films
1950s English-language films
Films about advertising
Films about television
Films directed by Frank Tashlin
Films scored by Cyril J. Mockridge
Films set in New York City
Films with screenplays by Frank Tashlin
United States National Film Registry films
CinemaScope films
1950s American films